Edinburgh Napier University RFC is a rugby union club based in Edinburgh, Scotland. The club operates a men's team and a women's team. Both currently play in the university leagues.

History

The East regional academy of the Scottish Rugby Academy has been based at Napier University since 2015.

Sides

The men's team has a 1st and 2nd XV.

Training takes place on Boroughmuir RFC's ground at Meggetland on Monday nights from 6.30-8.30pm. A second training session takes place on the Sighthill Campus on Fridays.

Honours

Men

 Scottish Conference 2A
 Champions (1): 2011-12
 Scottish Conference 3A
 Champions (1): 2009-10
 Scottish Conference 3B
 Champions (1): 2004-05
 Scottish Conference 4A
 Champions (1): 2008-09

Women

 Scottish Conference 2A
 Champions (1): 2017-18

References

Rugby union in Edinburgh
Scottish rugby union teams
University and college rugby union clubs in Scotland